Kevin Armedyah Nur Erwihas (born 7 February 2001) is an Indonesian professional footballer who plays as a attacking midfielder for Liga 1 club Arema.

Early life

Armedyah was born in Binjai and joined the youth academy of Binjai United as a youth player.

Club career 
Kevin joined a Liga 1 club Arema at 21 January 2023 after trialing. Before Kevin joined PSMS Medan, Kevin started his football career at Binjai United. Then, Kevin had time to strengthen Karo United at the Liga 2. In 2022, he signed for PSMS Medan. He left PSMS Medan in late 2022.

References

Football in Indonesia
Footballers in Indonesia